Porpoise Bay is an ice-filled embayment about  wide indenting the coast of Antarctica between Cape Goodenough and Cape Morse. The United States Exploring Expedition (1838–42) under Charles Wilkes applied the name "Porpoise Bay", after the USEE brig "Porpoise", to a large bay at about 66°S, 130°E. US-ACAN's identification of Porpoise Bay is based on the correlation of Wilkes' chart (1840) with G.D. Blodgett's reconnaissance map (1955) compiled from air photos taken by USN Operation Highjump (1946–47). The name has been applied to the large embayment lying close southwest in keeping with Wilkes' original naming.

Porpoise Basin is an undersea basin, located close to Porpoise Bay.

References 

Bays of Wilkes Land